The 1994 Men's Hockey World Cup was the eighth edition of the Hockey World Cup, the quadrennial world championship for men's national field hockey teams organized by the FIH. It was held from 23 November to 4 December 1994 in Sydney, Australia. Pakistan defeated the Netherlands 4–3 on penalties (full time 1-1) to lift the trophy.

Qualification

Umpires
Below is the list of umpires appointed by International Hockey Federation (FIH):

Shafat Baghdadi (PAK)
Gary Belder (AUS)
Tarlok Bhullar (IND)
Adriano De Vecchi (ITA)
Santiago Deo (ESP)
Steve Horgan (USA)
Rob Lathouwers (NED)
Don Prior (AUS)
Kiyoshi Sana (JPN)
Roger St. Rose (TTO)
Christopher Todd (ENG)
Patrick van Beneden (BEL)
Alan Waterman (CAN)
Richard Wolter (GER)

Results

Pool A

Pool B

Ninth to twelfth place classification

Crossover

Eleventh and twelfth place

Ninth and tenth place

Fifth to eighth place classification

Crossover

Seventh and eighth place

Fifth and sixth place

First to fourth place classification

Semi-finals

Third and fourth place

Final

Final standings

See also
1994 Women's Hockey World Cup

Notes

References

External links
Official FIH website

 
Men's Hockey World Cup
International field hockey competitions hosted by Australia
Sports competitions in Sydney
World
World Cup
Men's Hockey World Cup
Men's Hockey World Cup
Men's Hockey World Cup, 1994